Mouse keys is a feature of some graphical user interfaces that uses the keyboard (especially numeric keypad)
as a pointing device (usually replacing a mouse). Its roots lie in the earliest days of visual editors when line and column navigation was controlled with arrow keys.
Today, mouse keys usually refers to the numeric keypad layout standardized with the introduction of the X Window System in 1984.

Layout

History
Historically, MouseKeys supported GUI programs when many terminals had no dedicated pointing device. As pointing devices became ubiquitous, the use of mouse keys narrowed to situations where a pointing device was missing, unusable, or inconvenient. Such situations may arise from the following:
precision requirements (e.g., technical drawing)
disabled user or ergonomics issues
environmental limits (e.g., vibration in car or plane)
broken/missing/unavailable equipment

In 1987, Macintosh Operating System 4.2 Easy Access, provided MouseKeys support to all applications.  Easy access was (de)activated by clicking the shift key 5 times.

By the early 2020s, with Graphics Tablets becoming more common, a configuration change may be required before enabling MouseKeys.

MouseKeysAccel

The X Window System MouseKeysAccel control applies action (usually cursor movement) repeatedly while a direction key
{1,2,3,4,6,7,8,9} remains depressed. When the key is depressed, an action_delta is immediately applied.  If the key remains depressed, longer than mk_delay milliseconds, some action is applied every mk_interval milliseconds until the key is released. If the key remains depressed, after more than mk_time_to_max actions have been applied, action_delta magnified mk_max_speed times, is applied every mk_interval milliseconds.

The first mk_time_to_max actions increase smoothly according to an exponential.

These five parameters are configurable.

Enabling
Under the X Window Systems Xorg and XFree86 used on Unix-like systems such as Linux, BSD, and AIX, MouseKeys (and MouseKeysAccel), when available, is nominally (de)activated by ++. MouseKeys without acceleration (also known as plot mode) is sometimes available with +. This is nominally independent of the Window Manager in use, but may be overridden, or even made unavailable by a configuration file.

Before enabling, it may be necessary to change system configuration.
The setxkbmap utility can be used to change the configuration under Xorg:

setxkbmap -option keypad:pointerkeys

There are also various utilities to allow more precise control via user-configurable key bindings, such as xmousekeys and xdotool.

Since KDE5, MouseKeys is enabled and configured by systemsetting5 (Hardware → Input Devices → Mouse → Keyboard Navigation)

MouseKeys for Apple Inc's Mac OS X is enabled and configured via the Accessibility ([apple] → System Preferences → Accessibility → Mouse & Trackpad).

Microsoft changed the method of enabling between Windows 2000, Windows XP (added diagonal cursor movement and MouseKeysAccel), and Windows Vista.

Common usage

Replacing the mouse keys
 
Replacing the mouse keys by the numeric keypad is as follows:
 
Typing  (with the numeric keypad) is equivalent to clicking the selected button. By default, the selected button is the primary button (nominally under index finger, left button for most right-handed people and right button for most left-handed people). Typing  (with the numeric keypad) selects the alternate button (nominally under ring finger, right button for most right-handed people and left button for most left-handed people). Typing  (with the numeric keypad) selects the modifier button (nominally under the middle finger, middle button of a 3-button mouse). Typing  (with the numeric keypad) selects the primary button. The selection remains in effect until a different button is selected.

Assignment of left/middle/right button to primary/modifier/alternate, alternate/modifier/primary, or something else is settable by many means. Some mice have a switch, that swaps assignment of right and left keys. Many laptop bioses have a setting for mouse button assignment. Many window managers have a setting that permutes the assignment. Within the X Window System core protocol, permutation can be applied by xmodmap(1).

Moving the pointer by keys

For example,  will move the pointer upwards, while  will move it diagonally downwards to the left.

See also 
 FilterKeys
 StickyKeys
 ToggleKeys
 On-screen keyboard

References

Computer accessibility
Computing input devices
User interface techniques
Ergonomics